Ernest Tubb is an album by American country singer Ernest Tubb, released in 1975 (see 1975 in music).

Track listing
"I've Got All the Heartaches I Can Handle" (Shel Silverstein)
"If You Don't Quit Checkin' on Me (I'm Checking Out on You)" (Larry Cheshier, Murry Kellum)
"Busiest Memory in Town" (Geoff Morgan)
"I'm Living in Sunshine" (Jimmie Rodgers)
"You're My Best Friend" (Wayland Holyfield)
"It's Time to Pay the Fiddler" (Don Wayne, Walter Haynes)
"She's Already Gone" (Jim Mundy)
"I'd Like to Live It Again" (Smokey Stover)
"Door Is Always Open" (Bob McDill, Dickey Lee)
"Somewhere County Somewhere City USA" (Chris Stevenson)
"Holding Things Together" (Merle Haggard)

Personnel
Ernest Tubb – vocals, guitar
Pete Michaud – guitar
Charlie Hammond – guitar
Howard Owsley – pedal steel guitar
Henry Dunlap – piano
Owen Bradley – piano
Johnny Gimble – fiddle
Harold Bradley – bass
David Evan – bass
Don Mills – drums

Chart positions

References

Ernest Tubb albums
1975 albums
Albums produced by Owen Bradley
MCA Records albums